Manchester Black is a fictional character in American comic books published by DC Comics, in particular those featuring Superman. He was created by Joe Kelly and Doug Mahnke in Action Comics #775 (March 2001). Introduced as an antihero, the character later becomes a supervillain.

Fictional character biography

Pre-"Flashpoint" 
Manchester Black was a ruthless vigilante who led a crime fighting team called The Elite. Other than his thick English accent, his notorious Union Jack tattoo, and a few snippets he told about his life, little is known about him, although he is most likely from the city of Manchester, England. What is known includes insinuations that he was physically abused by his parents while growing up and has a hatred for people with "high moral concepts" who feel they are better than people like Black, who would do anything to survive. This hatred included superheroes who would only turn over captured villains to the police instead of killing them, which was the only way Manchester and the Elite felt villains could be dealt with. Black also claimed distant African and Korean heritage, but as he made these claims to justify his use of racist terms towards these groups, it is possible he was either lying or joking.

The Elite 
Black first appears as the leader of a team of super-powered antiheroes called The Elite, who gained worldwide popularity for viciously killing their foes and thus preventing them from coming back to cause more problems. Superman opposed this wanton violence, leading to a showdown on Jupiter's moon Io that was videotaped for Earth's media. Black used his powers to give Superman a stroke, and his teammates (Coldcast, Menagerie, and the Hat) apparently were able to destroy Superman in a giant explosion. While the Elite were gloating, however, Superman used his superspeed seemingly to kill all the team's members except Black. Superman then disabled the Englishman by using his X-ray vision to locate a growth inside Black's brain. He identified the growth as the source of Black's powers, and carefully fired his heat vision through Black's retinas, removing it and thus disabling Black.

Faced with the apparent loss of his powers, Black actually wept, hypocritically appalled that Superman had seemingly adopted the lethal tactics he and the Elite had spent so much time advocating, especially given that he was being taped at the time. After stating that he was certain his 'demonstration' had frightened those watching with the ugliness of it, Superman then revealed to the powerless Black that the rest of the Elite were only unconscious; he had not removed anything from Black's brain, instead merely causing a micro-concussion that temporarily shut down Black's powers, and that murdering opponents makes a hero no better than his enemies. Furious, Black declared that by not killing him, Superman had guaranteed that as long as Black was alive, he would come after Superman again and again, but Superman calmly replied that he wouldn't want it any other way, and that dreams like the ones he gave to Earth were what made life worth living until the example he and other heroes provided led to a better tomorrow.

Suicide Squad 
A temporarily beaten Black was taken into custody, and his mental powers were restored over the next few months. In his next appearance (in the Our Worlds At War storyline in The Adventures of Superman #593), Black was hired by the American government and President Lex Luthor to lead a new Suicide Squad featuring Chemo, Plasmus, Shrapnel, Mongul and Steel. The Squad's mission was to release the monster Doomsday against the threat of the galactic conqueror Imperiex. Upon his release, Doomsday apparently killed the entire Squad, with the exception of Black (Steel was later saved thanks to the actions of the Black Racer and Darkseid, although Mongul survived under unspecified circumstances), who escaped after 'reprogramming' Doomsday's mind so that Doomsday's hatred for Superman was temporarily redirected toward the Imperiex probes.

Suicide 
Black's final appearance (in the Ending Battle storyline running through the Superman titles in November and December 2002) found him mentally controlling dozens of supervillains by revealing Superman's secret identity and sending them en masse after the Man of Steel. Black targeted everyone in Superman's life—from Clark's old football coach to his current dentist—before launching a mass assault. Despite the odds against him, Superman managed to hold the villains back, later finding Black in his apartment, apparently having killed Lois Lane while Superman was occupied. Black taunted Superman, goading him into killing him, but Superman put Lois' body first and resolved to give her a proper burial. Despite fantasizing about killing Black, Superman resisted temptation and told Black that he would devote the rest of his life to keeping the villain behind bars and not in the morgue, as vengeance isn't justice.

Black was stunned at Superman's fortitude. His spirit wavered and his illusion crumbled, revealing Lois to be still alive. Black had been trying to force Superman into a position in which he would have to kill, intending for Superman to learn, after Black's demise, that he had broken his moral code for nothing, thus leaving him truly broken. But Black's plan failed, and he was forced to recognize that Superman genuinely believed everything he said. Distraught at the revelation that he had become a villain himself, Black made the supervillains forget Superman's secret identity. He then fired a telekinetic pulse at his own head, taking his own life.

The New 52 
In The New 52 (a reboot of DC Comics universe), Manchester Black is a high-ranking S.T.A.R. Labs executive. He created Algorithm, an A.I. that commits acts of terrorism throughout New York City in order to lure the Teen Titans to S.T.A.R. Labs, where he stages an attack against himself in order to be saved by the Titans and gain their trust. He then proposes a partnership; suspicious of Manchester Black's real intentions, Red Robin agrees to it, but sends Beast Boy to investigate him.

DC Rebirth 
Manchester Black makes his first appearance of the DC Rebirth in Superman (vol. 4) #23. He appears to be restored to his original look and powers, though his hair is black rather than purple. Black takes Jon Kent, the young Superboy, hostage and de-powers him, forcing him to watch images of his parents fighting off his creatures and suffering. The most shocking of these incidents occur when Lois Lane's right leg is cut off. Black is behind the illusory Hamilton County where the Kents live. He created it when he helped the Elites escape from the Kroogarians, with Deadman's Swamp being the center of most of the connected residents of the aliens who are disguised as citizens of Hamilton. These residents include the dairy farmer Mr. Cobb and his granddaughter Kathy; Jon's science teacher Mr. Martinez; Candice, the Hamilton Horn editor; police officer Goodman; the town doctor; and Hamilton's mayor. When Superman confronts Black, the two share their usual debate about killing villains versus Superman's usual methods, but Black turns the tables by restoring Jon's powers while 'programming' him to fight alongside Black. When Superman and Superboy break the quantum reactor and witness future timelines, Superboy turns on Black before his self-control is restored thanks to Lois. Before Black can attack the Kents further, Kathy uses her powers to create telepathic feedback, causing Black's consciousness to be transferred and trapped in the body of one of the Cobb family's dairy cows.

Superman and the Authority 
In this futuristic world, Black is cornered by the authorities for various crimes likely stemming from improper use of his powers at his flat in South London. Black nearly escapes through use of his telepathy before he is shot in the back by a sniper from a hovering helicopter and taken into custody by Superman. Awakening in the Fortress of Solitude, Black finds himself in a strange device healing his wounds and restoring his mobility as Superman asks for his help in saving the world. While Black initially rejects this request, he decides to put aside his combative past with the Man of Steel and help him form The Authority to save the world before it is too late.

In the next issue, when Black brings Midnighter and Apollo to the new team headed by Superman, they call them the World's Gayest, a play on the expression World's Finest usually referring to Batman and Superman, upon whom Midnighter and Apollo were initially designed, and he says he can say that because "I'm certified 48 percent gay on my mother's side".

Known relatives 
Manchester's sister Vera is the leader of the Justice League Elite. For a time, it appeared as though her mind had been taken over by the disembodied spirit of her brother, but it was later revealed to be a form of multiple personality disorder caused by her traumatic upbringing and aggravated by her contact with the near-infinite power of the Worlogog. Her instability nearly drove her to destroy London, but the other members of the Elite helped her to recover.

Powers and abilities
Black was a powerfully skilled telekinetic and telepath who was capable of precise uses of telekinesis; for example, he was able to give Superman the equivalent of a stroke by telekinetically pinching the blood vessels in his brain.

Black was able to create detailed illusions on a vast scale, erase memories, and could telepathically control thousands of minds at the same time. While controlling Bizarro and Silver Banshee, he was able to temporarily grant them enough sanity to enable them to communicate and to form plans. He was also able to switch Superman's and Bizarro's minds, putting them into each other's bodies.

In Rebirth, Black has demonstrated enough power to neutralize the powers of Jon Kent, the son of Superman and Lois Lane, and restore them at will later.

In other media

Television

Manchester Black appears in the fourth season of Supergirl, portrayed by David Ajala. This version is an initially unpowered-Black British man, nicknamed "Ches", who fell in love with an Empath from Ikthanol named Fiona Byrne (portrayed by Tiya Sircar) describe as "a man who goes into a gunfight with a knife and still wins". In the episode "Ahimsa", Manchester worked with Martian Manhunter to find Fiona after she was captured by the Children of Liberty. When they find a badly-wounded Fiona in Mercy Graves and Otis Graves' van, Manchester had his final moments with a dying Fiona as Martian Manhunter tries to take away her pain. Following Fiona's death, Manchester went to buy guns in order to get revenge on those responsible for Fiona's death. In the episode "Call to Action", Manchester begins his revenge by targeting some members of the Children of Liberty. After shooting most of them, Manchester interrogated a surviving member on the identity of his supervisor. After getting the name of Caldwell from the Children of Liberty member, Manchester shoots him. In the episode "Rather the Fallen Angel", Manchester helps Jimmy Olsen fight the Children of Liberty. Afterwards, he goes after Ben Lockwood. In the episode "Bunker Hill", Manchester makes use of the Lockwood Factory to confront Ben in his Agent Liberty alias where Manchester has his wife Lydia as a hostage. Despite some obstacles, Supergirl and Nia Nal thwart Manchester's attempts and Agent Liberty taking revenge. Both Manchester and Ben are arrested by the police. After being visited by Martian Manhunter at National City Men's Central Jail, Manchester watches from the windows as Ben is brought into the prison as the protesters chant "Liberty". In the episode "Menagerie", Manchester sends Menagerie a letter that pleases her. In the episode "What's So Funny About Truth, Justice and the American Way?", Manchester, now with dyed purple hair like his comic counterpart, escapes from prison and forms the Elite with Menagerie, a fifth-dimensional alien named Hat, and an unnamed Morae/Mo. They form the Elite in response to the bigotry of Agent Liberty and the Children of Liberty as well as the ineffectiveness of the government and D.E.O.. In the episode "O Brother, Where Art Thou?", Black uses a rare Martian artifact that grants telepathic powers to its user called the Staff of H'ronmeer. He was later killed by a vengeful J'onn J'onzz after the latter believed that he was the one who shot Olsen, disintegrating Manchester, who, in his last moments, found J'onn's unleashed rage "beautiful".

Film
Manchester Black appears as the main antagonist in Superman vs. The Elite, voiced by Robin Atkin Downes as an adult and with Grey DeLisle as a young Manchester. Like the comics, Manchester Black is the leader of the Elite where they do justice their way. Unlike the events of the original story, Superman actually does destroy the growth responsible for Manchester's powers, permanently removing them.

Video games
Manchester Black appears as an unlockable playable character in Lego Batman 3: Beyond Gotham, voiced again by Robin Atkin Downes.

Collected editions 
Some of Black's appearances have been reprinted in trade paperbacks:
 Justice League Elite (reprints: Action Comics #775, JLA #100, JLA Secret Files 2004 (lead story), and Justice League Elite #1-4, tpb, 208 pages, 2005, Titan  DC)
 Superman: Ending Battle (reprints 2002's Superman (1986 series) #186-87, Adventures Of Superman #608-09, Superman: Man Of Steel #130-31, and Action Comics #795-96, tpb, 192 pages, 2009, DC)

References

External links 
 
 DCU Guide entry
 The Captain's unofficial JLA Homepage entry
 Superman homepage
 GCD Project: Action Comics #775
 Comparisons between Manchester Black and The Mad Mod

Characters created by Joe Kelly
Characters created by Doug Mahnke
Comics characters introduced in 2001
DC Comics LGBT supervillains
DC Comics male superheroes
DC Comics male supervillains
DC Comics metahumans 
DC Comics characters who have mental powers
DC Comics telepaths
DC Comics telekinetics
Fictional bisexual males
Fictional Black British people
Fictional English people
Fictional suicides
Fictional characters with dream manipulation abilities
Fictional characters with energy-manipulation abilities
Superman characters